Tambao Airport  is an airstrip serving the manganese mining site of Tambao in the Oudalan Province, part of the Sahel Region of Burkina Faso.

See also
List of airports in Burkina Faso

References

External links 
 Airport record for Tambao Airport at Landings.com

Airports in Burkina Faso
Oudalan Province